The Edith Cummings Munson Golf Award is an annual award inspired by Edith Cummings Munson that is given to one of the top collegiate female golfers who excels in academics. The award is presented by the National Golf Coaches Association (NGCA).

Established in 1998, the award is presented annually to the Women's NCAA Division I golfer who is an upperclassman and both a WGCA All-American Scholar and All-American. If multiple golfers qualify, the award goes to the individual with the highest GPA.

Recipients

See also
 List of sports awards honoring women

References

External links
ECMGA Past Winners

Golf awards in the United States
College golf in the United States
College sports trophies and awards in the United States
Women's golf in the United States
Sports awards honoring women
Student athlete awards in the United States
Awards established in 1998